Cigaritis elima, the scarce shot silverline, is a species of lycaenid or blue butterfly found in Sri Lanka and India. The species was first described by Frederic Moore in 1877.

Description

Subspecies
Subspecies of Cigaritis elima:-

Cigaritis elima elima Moore, 1877 – India
Cigaritis elima uniformis Moore, 1882 – Kashmir
Cigaritis elima fairliei
Cigaritis elima ictina

References

Cigaritis
Fauna of Pakistan
Butterflies described in 1877